Pouria Saveh-Shemshaki (born April 30, 1987) is an alpine skier from Iran.  He, along with his brother, Hossein Saveh-Shemshaki, competed for Iran at the 2010 Winter Olympics.  His best result was a 60th place in the giant slalom.

References

External links

1987 births
Living people
Iranian male alpine skiers
Olympic alpine skiers of Iran
Alpine skiers at the 2010 Winter Olympics
Alpine skiers at the 2007 Asian Winter Games
Alpine skiers at the 2011 Asian Winter Games